Scutt is a surname. Notable people with the surname include:

Der Scutt (1934–2010), American architect and designer
Jocelynne Scutt (born 1947), Australian lawyer
Michelle Scutt (born 1960), British Olympic athlete